The 1987–88 Alpha Ethniki was the 52nd season of the highest football league of Greece. The season began on 6 September 1987 and ended on 15 May 1988. AEL won their first Greek title in its history. The season was notable as the only season where neither Panathinaikos or Olympiacos, by far the most successful and dominant clubs, finished in the top four.

The point system was: Win: 2 points - Draw: 1 point.

League table

Results

Top scorers

External links
Official Greek FA Site
RSSSF
Greek SuperLeague official Site
SuperLeague Statistics
 

Alpha Ethniki seasons
Greece
1